is a city located in Tokushima Prefecture, Japan. , the city had an estimated population of 23,782 in 12103 households and a population density of 33 persons per km².

Geography
Miyoshi is located in the western part of Tokushima Prefecture and is the largest municipality on the island of Shikoku, accounting for1/6 of the prefecture's geographic area. However, it is a very mountainous area with only 13% considered habitable. The Shikoku Mountains have many steep slopes and are subject to landslides and rockfalls. Traditional  steep slope farming methods the used to prevent soil erosion. The Hashikura Prefectural Natural Park spans the border between Miyoshi and Higashimiyoshi.

Neighbouring municipalities 
Tokushima Prefecture
 Mima
 Tsurugi
 Higashimiyoshi
 Naka
Kagawa Prefecture
Kan'onji
Mitoyo
Mannō
Ehime Prefecture
Shikokuchūō
Kōchi Prefecture
Kami
Ōtoyo, Kōchi

Climate
Miyoshi has a humid subtropical climate (Köppen climate classification Cfa) with hot summers and cool winters. Precipitation is high, but there is a pronounced difference between the wetter summers and drier winters.

Demographics
Per Japanese census data, the population of Miyoshi in 2020 is 23,605 people. Miyoshi has been conducting censuses since 1920.

History 
As with all of Tokushima Prefecture, the area of Miyoshi was part of ancient Awa Province. From the Muromachi period it was the seat of the Miyoshi clan, a once powerful warlord clan who ruled most of Shikoku and parts of Honshu..  During the Edo period, the area was part of the holdings of Tokushima Domain ruled by the Hachisuka clan from their seat at Tokushima Castle. Following the Meiji restoration, it was organized into 10 villages within Miyoshi District, Tokushima with the creation of the modern municipalities system on October 1, 1889, including the villages of Ikeda (池田村), Mino (三野村),  Sanmyo (三名村), and Minawa (三縄村). Ikeda was raised to town status on October 1, 1905  and Mino on January 26, 1924. Sanyo and Minawa merged on September 30, 1956 to form the town of Yamashiro.

The city of Miyoshi was established on March 1, 2006, from the merger between the towns of Ikeda, Ikawa, Mino and Yamashiro, (all from Miyoshi District) and the villages of Higashiiyayama and Nishiiyayama from Mima District.

Government
Miyoshi has a mayor-council form of government with a directly elected mayor and a unicameral city council of 22 members. Miyoshi contributes two members to the Tokushima Prefectural Assembly. In terms of national politics, the city is part of Tokushima 2nd district of the lower house of the Diet of Japan.

Economy
The economy of Miyoshi is strongly dependent on agriculture, forestry and small-scale food processing.

Education
Miyoshi has 13 public elementary schools and six public middle schools operated by the city government and three public high schools operated by the Tokushima Prefectural Department of Education. The prefecture also operates one special education school for the handicapped.

Transportation

Railway
 Shikoku Railway Company – Tokushima Line
  - 
 Shikoku Railway Company – Dosan Line
  -  -  -  -  -  -  -  -

Highways 
  Tokushima Expressway

Sister city relations
  The Dalles, Oregon, United States

Local attractions
Unpen-ji, 66th temple on the Shikoku Pilgrimage
Hashikura Prefectural Natural Park
 Iya Valley
 Kazura Bridge
 Oku Kazura Bridge
 Oboke Gorge
 Koboke Gorge
 Yoshino River

Noted people from Miyoshi
Miho Takai, politician
Shunichi Yamaguchi, politician
Kikuji Yamashita, artist

References

External links

 Miyoshi City official website 
 miyoshi-tourism 

 
Cities in Tokushima Prefecture